Ilud (also Romanized as Īlūd) is a village in Gowdeh Rural District, in the Central District of Bastak County, Hormozgan Province, Iran. At the 2006 census, its population was 1,257, in 284 families.

References 

Populated places in Bastak County